Baigent is a surname. Notable people with the surname include:

Bertie Baigent (born 1995), British conductor and organist
Edward Baigent (1813–1892), New Zealand sawmiller and politician
George Baigent (1817–1854), English cricketer
Harold Baigent (1916–1996), New Zealand actor
Henry Baigent (1844–1929), New Zealand sawmiller and politician
Michael Baigent (1948–2013), New Zealand writer
Richard Baigent (born 1965), English cricketer